Tim Besse (born 1980) is an American entrepreneur and business executive. Besse is most notable for co-founding Glassdoor in 2007 and for currently serving as the firm's Chief Anything Officer. 

Besse earned a Bachelor of Science degree in Accounting from the Weatherhead School of Management at Case Western Reserve University in 2002. After graduating, Besse started his career at Expedia where he eventually served as the Director of Product Management and Online Marketing for its Asia Pacific division. In this role, he facilitated Expedia's international expansion and the growth of several of the firm's early stage businesses, including telesales and online luxury. 

In July 2007, Besse left Expedia to join forces with former Expedia colleagues Robert Hohman and Rich Barton to found Glassdoor, a website where employees can anonymously review their companies. The three partners pooled nearly ten million dollars to fund the firm until it attracted venture capital interest in November of that year. Besse initially served as the firm's chief marketing officer, overseeing the firm's growth from zero to five million unique users. In 2011, he was recognized by Workforce Management, a multimedia publication, as one of the internet industry's top fifteen "Game Changers". In 2014, he took on his current role as Chief Anything Officer, addressing issues that arise as the firm expands globally.

References

1981 births
Living people
American computer businesspeople
Businesspeople from Ohio
Case Western Reserve University alumni
20th-century American businesspeople